Horná Kráľová is a village and municipality in Šaľa District, in the Nitra Region of south-west Slovakia.

History
In historical records the village was first mentioned in 1113.

Geography
The village lies at an altitude of 135 metres and covers an area of 19.117 km².
It has a population of about 1855 people.

Ethnicity
The village is about 81% Slovak and 18% Hungarian.

Facilities
The village has a public library and a football pitch.

Genealogical resources

The records for genealogical research are available at the state archive "Statny Archiv in Nitra, Slovakia"

 Roman Catholic church records (births/marriages/deaths): 1673-1895 (parish B)

See also
 List of municipalities and towns in Slovakia

External links
https://web.archive.org/web/20080111223415/http://www.statistics.sk/mosmis/eng/run.html
Surnames of living people in Horna Kralova

Villages and municipalities in Šaľa District